Alan Pate (born January 19, 1953) is an American professional golfer who played on the PGA Tour and the Nationwide Tour.

Pate was born in Mobile, Alabama. He played college golf at the University of Alabama, where he was an All-American in 1973. Throughout his career, Pate played on the PGA Tour (1977–79), Nationwide Tour (1990, 1993–94, 1996–97), European Tour, Sunshine Tour and the South American Tour. He won the Nike Dakota Dunes Open on the Nationwide Tour in 1993. On the PGA Tour, his best finish was T-5 at the 1978 Kemper Open.

Professional wins (1)

Nike Tour wins (1)

Results in major championships

CUT = missed the half-way cut
Note: Pate only played in the U.S. Open.

See also 

 Spring 1977 PGA Tour Qualifying School graduates

References

External links

American male golfers
Alabama Crimson Tide men's golfers
PGA Tour golfers
Golfers from Alabama
Sportspeople from Mobile, Alabama
1953 births
Living people